Macrophthalmus erato is a species of crab in the family Macrophthalmidae. It was described by de Man in 1888.

References

Ocypodoidea
Crustaceans described in 1888